The 2011 Finnish League Cup is the 15th season of the Finnish League Cup, Finland's second-most prestigious cup football tournament. FC Honka are the defending champions, having won their first league cup last year.

The cup consists of two stages. First there will be a group stage that involves the 14 Veikkausliiga teams divided into two groups. The top four teams from each group will enter the one-legged elimination rounds – quarter-finals, semi-finals and the final.

Group stage
Every team will play every other team of its group once, either home or away. The matches will be played from 18 January to 15 March 2011.

Group 1

Group 2

Knockout stage

Quarter-finals

Semi-finals

Final

External links
 Veikkausliiga Liigacup 2011
 Finnish League Cup on goalzz.com

Finnish League Cup
League Cup
Finnish League Cup